Mundiya Kepanga is a Papuan chief from the Tari region in the Highlands of Papua New Guinea.

Originating from a traditional tribal community, Mundiya Kepanga has a unique vision on Western society, acquired following his multiple trips across Europe and North America.

He is a seasoned speaker, regularly hosted by schools, natural history museums, scientists and assemblies devoted to indigenous people. Through his lectures, he seeks to raise awareness to the culture of his people while encouraging us to reflect upon our view of indigenous people and of ourselves.

Among the actions he has taken to favor dialogue between cultures, he has made a gift of a complete set of his community's tribal costumes to the Museum of Natural History in Rouen (France). As well as putting into operation projects devoted to the preservation of the planet, he is the initiator of eco-development programs such as the creation of a traditional bed and breakfast, an essential resource for his village.

Since 2000, several books and documentaries have been made on his perspective on the Western world such as "Reversed Exploration" (Production Bonne Pioche), which was broadcast by Canal+ and National Geographic in more than twenty countries. He also co-authored several scientific articles, including in collaboration with Yves Coppens and Jean Malaurie, in which he shared his vision of health, nature and environment.

Invited as traditional chief to several meetings organized on the occasion of the COP21 Summit on climate change, he notably took part in the Indigenous People Facing Climate Change conference, organized at Musée de l'Homme in Paris joining Nicolas Hulot, Gilles Boeuf and Raoni Metuktire.

Biography 

Mundiya's full name is Ukuma Mundiya Kepanga. He was born in the mid-sixties in the heart of the Highlands in Papua New Guinea, in a small hut built specially for his birth at Anda Mini in the Telabo region. He belongs to the Telabo Angi Puria clan, part of the Huli tribe, whose members live mainly in the Tari region in the centre of the Hela province.

He leads a simple and traditional life, earning his living from sweet potato crops and pig farming. As all young Huli men, when he was a teenager, he let his hair grow to make a manda, a ritual wig worn for the ritual initiation ceremony. Since then, he became adept at making and collecting adornments and feathers and joined his community's traditional dance group sing-Sing.

In September 2001, Mundiya met the French photographer and filmmaker Marc Dozier, specialist of Papua New Guinea and travelled with him as his guide for several weeks. This meeting is recounted in an article published in the French travel magazine Grands Reportages Dans la maison des hommes.

In 2003, Mundiya and his cousin Polobi Palia left their country for the first time, invited by Marc Dozier to discover France. The trip quickly took on an unexpected dimension, and the enthusiasm raised by their presence, coupled with their colourful comments led to the publication of a book, Le long-long voyage by Dakota publishing.

Late 2006 – early 2007, Mundiya and his cousin Polobi were invited a second time to France, and this trip led to the making of a 100-minute documentary The reversed exploration (film by Jean-Marie Barrère and Marc Dozier – Bonne Pioche Production). The film shows Mundiya and Polobi travelling through France and making comments on the French way of life, in the style of the Persian Letters by Montesquieu. Broadcast for the first time on the French TV channel Canal+ on 8 January 2008, the film was relatively successful and was later broadcast by numerous other French and international TV channels like National Geographic.

Between 2008 and 2015, Mundiya returned to Europe several times and gave numerous conferences in France, Belgium, Switzerland, Luxembourg and United States... Through these lectures, he fosters a new outlook towards all people of the world, in a spirit of tolerance and respect.

In 2012, with the help of his French friend Marc Dozier acting as his translator, Mundiya published his autobiography Au pays des hommes blancs, les mémoires d'un Papou en Occident (Niugini) providing a fresh outlook on our Western world, packed with his characteristic sense of humour and wisdom: «It is you, the white men, who invented books… However, even though I cannot read or write, I still have a lot to say about your eccentric tribe!».

In 2012, when he heard that a Maori skull was being restituted to New-Zealand indigenous communities by Sebastian Minchin, director of the Natural History Museum in Rouen, France, Mundiya Kepanga decided to offer a full set of traditional Huli adornments to the same museum. During the official handing-over ceremony on 20 April 2012, he declared: "I am very proud to give you my own adornments. I know you will take good care of them. After my death, your children and grandchildren will be able to admire them and understand what they mean to my tribe. This gift is a bridge between our two worlds." The adornments, called Djeri in Huli, are currently on the third floor of the Natural History Museum in Rouen, in a display cabinet in the Australasia section.

In 2015, he was invited to participate as a traditional leader in several conferences organized during the COP21 summit on climate change. Alongside Nicolas Hulot, Gilles Boeuf and Raoni Metuktire, he took part in the Indigenous People Facing Climate Change conference held at Musée de l'Homme in Paris in which he shared his vision on climate change and its impact on his community. Mundiya Kepanga will also participate at the UNESCO Auditorium on 5 December 2015, at the How to learn from the other? conference. Organized by the University of Terre, the event will bring together over a hundred French personalities including Jacques Attali, Isabelle Autissier, Jean-Louis Etienne, Nicolas Hulot, Corinne Lepage, Bertrand Piccard, Raoni Metuktire and Reza Deghati.

Spelling 

As Huli is not a written language, the name Mundiya can be spelt in different ways: Mudeya, Mundeya, Mundiya... The most commonly used spelling is the one used in his passport, Mundiya Kepanga.

Filmography 
 BrotherWood, Lato Sensu production, a documentary about forest currently under production.
 A Papuan in Binche, Niugini production, 7 minutes, a movie by Marc Dozier.
 Bluebell girls meet the Papuans, One Planet production, 52 minutes, a movie by Jean-Marie Barrère and Marc Dozier.
 The reversed exploration, Bonne Pioche production, 104 minutes, a movie by Jean-Marie Barrère and Marc Dozier.

Bibliography 
 Contribution of indigenous peoples to the definition of health on the occasion of the COP 21, co-author avec Philippe Charlier, Yves Coppens, Jean Malaurie, Brun, Hoang-Opermann, Hassin, Hervé, Paris, 2015.
 Autopsie de l'Art premier, preface of the book of paleopathologist Philippe Charlier, Rocher Publishing, Paris 2012.
 Le cabaret du bout du monde, le Lido chez les Papous, Niugini publishing, 164 pages, 2013.
 Au pays des Hommes blancs, Niugini publishing, 184 pages, 2012.
 La tribu des Français vue par des Papous, Dakota publishing, 288 pages, 2009.
 L'Exploration inversée, Grands Reportages, 14 pages, 2008.
 Le long – long voyage, Dakota publishing, 200 pages, 2006.
 Dans la maison des hommes, magazine Grands Reportages, 14 pages, 2002.

References

External links 
 Marc Dozier web site.
 Marc Dozier’s Interview, Internaute.
 Interview on Marc Dozier's web site.

Indigenous people
Living people
Year of birth missing (living people)
People from the Highlands Region
Papua New Guinean environmentalists
Huli people